The Last Chance is a 1937 British drama film directed by Thomas Bentley and starring Frank Leighton, Judy Kelly and Laurence Hanray. Its plot involves a gunrunner who makes a jail break in order to gather evidence to prove he is innocent of murder. It was made as a supporting feature at British International Pictures' second studio at Welwyn.

Cast
 Frank Leighton as Alan Burmister 
 Judy Kelly as Mary Perrin 
 Laurence Hanray as Mr. Perrin 
 Wyndham Goldie as John Worrall 
 Franklyn Bellamy as Inspector Cutts 
 Aubrey Mallalieu as Judge Croyle 
 Billy Milton as Michael Worrall 
 Jenny Laird as Betty 
 Charles Sewell as Brough 
 Alfred Wellesley as Ivor Connell

References

Bibliography
 Chibnall, Steve. Quota Quickies: The Birth of the British 'B' film. British Film Institute, 2007.
 Low, Rachael. History of the British Film: Filmmaking in 1930s Britain. George Allen & Unwin, 1985 .

External links

1937 films
1937 drama films
British drama films
1930s English-language films
Films shot at Welwyn Studios
Films directed by Thomas Bentley
British films based on plays
British black-and-white films
1930s British films